The South Africa national cricket team toured India for a two-match Test series, and a three-match One Day International (ODI) series in February 2010.

Squads

Tour matches

2-day: Board President's XI v South Africans

Test series

1st Test

2nd Test

ODI series

1st ODI

2nd ODI

3rd ODI

Media coverage

Television
NEO Cricket (live) - India, Bangladesh, Sri Lanka, Indonesia, Hong Kong (China) and UAE
Doordarshan (live) (only one-day matches) - India
Sky Sports (live) - Ireland and the United Kingdom
Zee Sports (live) - United States of America
Supersport (live) – South Africa, Kenya and Zimbabwe
Setanta Sports Australia (live) - Australia
GEO Super (live) - Pakistan
Astro Box Office (pay per view) - Malaysia
StarHub (pay per view) - Singapore

References

External links
 

2010 in Indian cricket
2010 in South African cricket
Indian cricket seasons from 2000–01
International cricket competitions in 2009–10
2010